The Heart on the Sleeve (French: Le Coeur sur la main) is a 1948 French comedy film directed by André Berthomieu and starring Bourvil, Michèle Philippe and Jacques Louvigny.

It had admissions in France of 3,657,951.

It was shot at the Billancourt Studios in Paris and on location in the city. The film's sets were designed by the art director Raymond Nègre.

Plot
Léo Ménard works as a sexton in a small parish. When the Parisian singer Mary Pinson performs in his village he's asked to accompany her on his accordion, because the pianist is unavailable. His nightly performance causes a scandal in the Catholic community and he loses his job. He leaves to Paris to look up the singer.

Main cast
 Bourvil as Leon Ménard - le bedeau d'un village normand qui devient vedette de cabaret 
 Michèle Philippe as Mary Pinson - une chanteuse dont s'éprend Léon 
 Lolita De Silva as Solange - la fille du cirque 
 Robert Berri as Alex - le fiancé de Mary 
 Jacques Louvigny as Martineau - l'imprésario 
 Charles Bouillaud as Paulo - le guitariste 
 Paul Faivre as Le curé 
 Blanche Denège as Augustine - la bonne du curé 
 Marcelle Monthil as Mademoiselle Aglaé

References

Comme beaucoup pourraient le penser, le cœur sur la main n’est pas une expression. L’expression est : la main sur le cœur (générosité)

Bibliography
 Rège, Philippe. Encyclopedia of French Film Directors, Volume 1. Scarecrow Press, 2009.

External links

1948 films
French comedy films
1948 comedy films
1940s French-language films
Films shot at Billancourt Studios
Films directed by André Berthomieu
Films set in Paris
French black-and-white films
1940s French films